Crosson is a surname. Notable people with the surname include:

David Crosson, presenter on The Game Room (later Classic Game Room)
Iman Crosson (born 1982), American actor
Joe Crosson (1903–1949), Alaska Hall of Fame pilot, sister Marvel Crosson, Mount Crosson
Marvel Crosson (1904–1929), Alaska Women's Hall of Fame pilot, sister of Joe
Mount Crosson, satellite peak to Denali for Joe Crosson
Norman Crosson, pilot of Little Eva, a B-24 Liberator 
Wilhelmina Marguerita Crosson (1900-1991), American educator
William Crosson Feazel (1895-1965), Depression-era U.S. Senator from Louisiana

See also
Crosson Ice Shelf, Antarctic ice shelf

References